The Mek languages are a well established family of Papuan languages spoken by the Mek peoples. They form a branch of the Trans–New Guinea languages (TNG) in the classifications of Stephen Wurm (1975) and of Malcolm Ross (2005).

Mek, then called Goliath, was identified by M. Bromley in 1967. It was placed in TNG by Wurm (1975).

Languages
The Mek languages form three dialect chains (Heeschen 1998):
 Eastern: Ketengban (including Okbap, Omban, Bime, Onya), Una (Goliath), Eipomek
 Northern: Kosarek Yale–Nipsan, Nalca
 Western: Korupun-Sela (including Dagi, Sisibna, Deibula)

Proto-language

Phonemes
Usher (2020) reconstructs the consonant and vowel inventories as 'perhaps' as follows:

{| 
| *m || *n ||  || *ŋ || 
|-
| *p || *t ||  || *k || *kʷ
|-
| *(m)b || *(n)d ||  || *(ŋ)g || *(ŋ)gʷ
|-
|  || *s ||  ||  || 
|-
| *w || *l || *j ||  || 
|}

{| 
|i|| ||u
|-
|e|| ||o
|-
|ɛ|| ||ɔ
|-
| ||a||ɒ
|}

{| 
|ei||ou
|-
|ɛi||ɔu
|-
|ai||au
|-
|aɛ||aɔ
|}

Pronouns
Pronouns are:
{| class="wikitable"
! !!sg!!pl
|-
!1
|*na||*nu[n]
|-
!2
|*kan||*kun (?)
|-
!3
|*ɛl
|*tun, *[t/s]ig
|}

The difference between the two 3pl forms is not known. 2pl and 3pl have parallels in Momuna /kun tun/.

Basic vocabulary
Some lexical reconstructions by Usher (2020) are:

{| class="wikitable sortable"
! gloss !! Proto-Mek !! Proto-East Mek !! Kimyal !! Proto-Northwest Mek !! Proto-Momuna-Mek !! Momuna
|-
! hair/feather
| *p[ɔ]t[ɔ]ŋ || *pɔtɔŋ || osoŋ || *hɔŋ ||  || 
|-
! ear/twelve
| *aᵓ ||  || ɔ || *aᵓ ||  || 
|-
! eye
| *atiŋ || *asiŋ || isiŋ || *haⁱŋ || *ɒtig || ɒtù
|-
! tooth/sharp
| *jo̝ ||  ||  ||  || *jo̝ || jó
|-
! tongue
| *se̝l[ija]mu || *[se̝]l[ija]mu || selamu || *se̝l[i]mu ||  || 
|-
! foot/leg
| *jan || *jan || jan || *jan || *j[a/ɒ]n || 
|-
! blood
| *e̝ne̝ŋ || *ɪnɪŋ || eneŋ || *e̝ne̝ŋ || *jo̝ne̝g || 
|-
! bone
| *jɔk || *jɔk || jw-aʔ || *jɔʔ[ɔ] ||  || 
|-
! breast
| *mɔᵘm || *mɔᵘm || moᵘm || *mɔᵘm || *mɔᵘm || mɒ̃ᵘ
|-
! louse
| *ami || *ami || imi || *ami || *ami || ami
|-
! dog
| *gam || *[k/g]am || gam || *gam || *gɒm || kɒ̀
|-
! pig
| *be̝sam || *bɪsam ||  || *bham ||  || wɒ́
|-
! bird
| *mak, *mag || *mak || -ma (?) || *-ma (?) || *mak || má
|-
! egg/fruit/seed
| *do̝[k] || *dʊk || do || *do̝[k] ||  || dɒko ~ dɒku
|-
! tree/wood
| *gal ||  || gal || *gal || *gɒl || kɒ̀
|-
! woman/wife
| *ge̝l || *[k/g]ɪl || gel || *ge̝l ||  || 
|-
! sun
| *k[ɛ]t[e̝]ŋ || *k[ɛ]t[ɪ]ŋ || isiŋ || *he̝ŋ ||  || 
|-
! moon
| *wal || *wal || wal || *wal ||  || 
|-
! water/river
| *m[ɛ/a]g || *mɛk || mag || *m[ɛ/a]g ||  || 
|-
! fire
| *o̝ᵘg || *ʊᵘk || ug || *[u]g ||  || 
|-
! stone
| *gɛⁱl; *gidig || *[k/g]ɛⁱl || girig || *gidig ||  || kè
|-
! path/way
| *bi[t/s]ig || *bi[t/s]ik || bisig || *bhig ||  || 
|-
! name
| *si || *si || si || *si || *si || si
|-
! eat/drink
| *de̝-(b) || *dɪ-(b) || de- || *de̝-(b) ||  || de-
|-
! one
| *[na]tɔn || *tɔn || nason || *nhɔn ||  || 
|-
! two/ring finger
| *b[e̝/ɛ]te̝ne̝ || *b[ɪ/ɛ]tɪnɪ || besene || *bhe̝ne̝ ||  || 
|}

Vocabulary comparison
The following basic vocabulary words are from McElhanon & Voorhoeve (1970), Voorhoeve (1975), and Heeschen (1978), as cited in the Trans-New Guinea database:

{| class="wikitable sortable"
! gloss !! Eipomek !! Korapun-Sela !! Nalca !! Una !! Yale, Korsarek !! Ketengban
|-
! head
| kiisok || asak || huk ||  || heiyɔ´; khe yok || giso
|-
! hair
| fotong || asuŋ || hoŋ || otoŋ || hong; hɔŋ || potong
|-
! ear
| amol ||  ||  ||  || amalé || amol
|-
! eye
| asing || isiŋ || hiŋ || atsiŋ || heiŋ; hɩng || asorue
|-
! nose
| uu ||  ||  ||  || uryam || u
|-
! tooth
| sii || si || si || tsi || si || tsi
|-
! tongue
| sii tang ||  ||  ||  || selemú || lyemngwe
|-
! leg
|  || yan saŋ || yan || yan || yan || 
|-
! louse
| amnye || wutnavu || amnya ||  || ami; ami´ || amnye
|-
! dog
| kam || kʰam; kham || kam ||  || kam || kam
|-
! pig
| basam || pham || pham || uduk || pam; pham || besam
|-
! bird
| make || winaŋ || winiŋ || mai || winang; winaŋ || ma
|-
! egg
| duk || waŋga || doug ||  || winaŋ wana; winang wangká || do
|-
! blood
| ining || iniŋ || iniŋ ||  || eneŋ; ining || yabye
|-
! bone
| yoke || iaŋ birin || yog ||  || yok; you || yo
|-
! skin
|  || boxa || phok ||  || kon || 
|-
! breast
| taram ||  ||  ||  || saram || taram
|-
! tree
| yo || kal; khal || kal; khal ||  || kal || co
|-
! man
|  || nimi || nim ||  || nimi || 
|-
! woman
| kilape ||  ||  ||  || kəlabo || nerape
|-
! sky
| iim ||  ||  ||  || im || im
|-
! sun
| ketinge || isiŋ || hiŋ ||  || hein; hɛng || getane
|-
! moon
| wale ||  ||  ||  || wal || ware
|-
! water
| mek || mak || mek || meye || mak || me
|-
! fire
| uukwe || uk || uk || uke || ouk̂; ow || ukwe
|-
! stone
| kedinge || khirik || kirik || waliŋ || kirik || gil
|-
! road, path
| biisiik ||  ||  ||  || bi || bisi
|-
! name
| sii || utnimi || si ||  || si || si
|-
! eat
| dibmal ||  || dilom || kwaːniŋ || el dilamla; tiu loŋa || jibmar
|-
! one
| ton || thoxunok || nhon ||  || otunohon; se'lek || tegen
|-
! two
|  || bisini || phein ||  || pɛndɛ; phende || bitini
|}

Evolution
Mek reflexes of proto-Trans-New Guinea (pTNG) etyma are:

Eipo language:
mun ‘belly’ < *mundun ‘internal organs’
kuna ‘shadow’ < *k(a,o)nan
saŋ ‘dancing song’ < *saŋ
getane ‘sun’ < *kVtane

Bime language:
mundo ‘belly’ < *mundun ‘internal organs’

Kosarek language:
ami ‘louse’ < *niman
si ‘tooth’ < *(s,t)i(s,t)i
tomo < *k(i,u)tuma ‘night’

Yale language:
de ‘to burn’ < *nj(a,e,i)
mon ‘belly’ < *mundun ‘internal organs’
xau ‘ashes’ < *kambu

Further reading
Heeschen, Volker. 1978. The Mek languages of Irian Jaya with special reference to the Eipo language. Irian 7(2): 3–46.
Heeschen, Volker. 1992. The position of the Mek languages of Irian Jaya among the Papuan languages: History, typology and speech. Bijdragen tot de Taal-, Land- en Volkenkunde 148(3/4): 465–488.

References

External links 
 Timothy Usher, New Guinea World, Proto–Momuna–Mek
 (ibid.) Proto–Mek

 
Languages of Papua New Guinea
Momuna–Mek languages